Spartak is a rural locality (a selo) and the administrative centre of Spartaksky Selsoviet, Yermekeyevsky District, Bashkortostan, Russia. The population was 924 as of 2010. There are 9 streets.

Geography 
Spartak is located 18 km southeast of Yermekeyevo (the district's administrative centre) by road. Lyakhovo is the nearest rural locality.

References 

Rural localities in Yermekeyevsky District